Sheikh Rumani Ba 'Alawi Masjid (Somali: Masaajidka Shaykh Rumani Ba 'Alawi, also known as Masaajidka Rumaaniga or Masaajidka Aw Shukumaan) is a small mosque found in the historical Hamar Weyne district in Mogadishu.

Overview 
The mosque locally to as "Aw Shukuman" isn't an easy mosque to get to, it can only be reached through a series of long winding ancient alleyways. During a recent renovation of the mosque, 2 important artefacts were lost. One being the a piece of wood with 822 AH (which roughly corresponds to 1419 AD), the other being an iron ring hanging from one of the old beams that was being replaced. The ring was similar to those found in the older homes in the neighbourhood, said to have been used to hang lanterns.

See also 

 Jama'a Shingani, Shingani
 Fakr ad-Din Mosque
 Arba'a Rukun Mosque
 Jama'a Xamar Weyne, Xamar Weyne
 Awooto Eeday
 Mohamed Al Tani

References 

Mosques in Somalia